The Rhizobiales-2 RNA motif is a set of RNAs found in certain bacteria that are presumed to be homologous because they conserve a common primary and secondary structure (see diagram).  The motif was discovered using bioinformatics, and is found only within bacteria that belong to the order Hyphomicrobiales (formerly Rhizobiales), in turn a kind of alphaproteobacteria.  Because Rhizobiales-2 RNAs are not consistently located in proximity to genes of a consistent class or function, these RNAs are presumed to function as non-coding RNAs.

See also
Flg-Rhizobiales RNA motif

References

External links
 

Non-coding RNA